The Kleiner Winterberg is a mountain, in the borough of Wernigerode, Harz county, in the German state of Saxony-Anhalt. It is found in the Harz Mountains and is a subpeak of the Wurmberg, the highest point in the neighbouring state of Lower Saxony.

Location 
The Kleiner Winterberg lies within the Harz/Saxony-Anhalt Nature Park just east of the border with Lower Saxony and about 2.2 km southwest of the village of  Schierke in the borough of Wernigerode. To the northeast, on the other side of Schierke on the Cold Bode, rises the ridge of Hohnekamm (900.6 m; with its tors, the Hohneklippen). Towards the southeast the countryside descends to the Barenberg (695.5 m), to the south it drops into the valley of the Bremke stream, which rises on the mountainside to the west on the Wurmberg (971.2 m). To the northwest is the Großer Winterberg (906.4 m) and, beyond that, to the Brocken (1,141.1 m).

Winter sports area 
As part of the planning for the Wurmberg 2015 concept, a ski lift or gondola lift and four new downhill runs are to be built in the area between the Großer and Kleiner Winterberg and the Wurmberg towards the village of Schierke.

References 

Wernigerode
Mountains of the Harz
Mountains and hills of Saxony-Anhalt
Mountains under 1000 metres